The Mexican state of Oaxaca held an election on Sunday, 1 August 2004.
At stake was the office of the Oaxaca State Governor, the unicameral Oaxaca State Congress, and 570 mayors and municipal councils.

Governor
At the time of the election, the sitting governor was José Murat Casab of the Institutional Revolutionary Party (PRI).

 

Source: IEEO

On the same day
2004 Aguascalientes state election
2004 Baja California state election

See also
Politics of Mexico
List of political parties in Mexico

External links
Oaxaca State Electoral Institute 

2004 elections in Mexico
Oaxaca elections
July 2004 events in Mexico